This is a list of films featuring hallucinogens.

List of films

See also
 List of drug films

References

Hallucinogens
 *